James Michael Pratt is an American writer. His novel The Lost Valentine (originally published as The Last Valentine) was adapted into a film released by Hallmark Hall of Fame in 2011. He has been called a Master of moral fictionby Booklist for his realistic depictions of love. Pratt has 7 other titles listed at his website including The Lost Valentine. A native of Simi Valley, CA he is married and the father of two adult children. He credits growing up in California for many of the influences found in his stories. He has three additional books being adapted to film including a new title, yet to be released, When the Last Leaf Falls.Published worksTicket HomeThe Lighthouse KeeperThe Last Valentine 1998 and released in 2011 as The Lost ValentineThe Good HeartThe Christ ReportParadise BayMOM, The Woman Who Made Oatmeal Stick to My RibsDAD, The Man Who Lied to Save the PlanetAs A Man Thinketh, In His HeartFilm adaptionThe Lost Valentine was viewed by over 14.3 million households as a CBS Movie of the Week and Hallmark Hall of Fame on January 30, 2011. It was based upon the novel, The Last Valentine by James Michael Pratt first published in 1998 by St. Martin's Press.''

References

External links
 
 
 

1953 births
Living people
20th-century American novelists
21st-century American novelists
American male novelists
American film producers
Writers from California
20th-century American male writers
21st-century American male writers